Processor architecture may refer to:

 Instruction set (also called an instruction set architecture)
 Microarchitecture
 Processor design